Donaldson is a town in Hot Spring County, Arkansas, United States.  The population was 301 at the 2010 census.

Geography
U.S. Route 67 runs through the northern side of the community, leading northeast  to Malvern, the county seat, and southwest  to Arkadelphia. Arkansas Highway 51 has its northern terminus in Donaldson and leads  to Arkadelphia by a more southerly route.

Demographics

As of the census of 2000, there were 326 people, 130 households, and 93 families residing in the town. The population density was 499.1 inhabitants per square mile (193.6/km2). The racial makeup of the town was 97.85% White, 0.61% Native American, and 1.53% from two or more races.  0.61% of the population were Hispanic or Latino of any race.

There were 130 households, out of which 31.5% had children under the age of 18 living with them, 56.9% were married couples living together, 11.5% had a female householder with no husband present, and 27.7% were non-families. 25.4% of all households were made up of individuals, and 16.9% had someone living alone who was 65 years of age or older.  The average household size was 2.51 and the average family size was 3.01.

In the town, the population was spread out, with 26.7% under the age of 18, 8.6% from 18 to 24, 25.2% from 25 to 44, 24.5% from 45 to 64, and 15.0% who were 65 years of age or older.  The median age was 36 years. For every 100 females, there were 97.6 males.  For every 100 females age 18 and over, there were 100.8 males.

The median income for a household in the town was $22,813, and the median income for a family was $28,500. Males had a median income of $29,250 versus $20,500 for females. The per capita income for the town was $13,307.  About 15.0% of families and 17.1% of the population were below the poverty line, including 25.3% of those under age 18 and 10.7% of those age 65 or over.

Education 
Public education for early childhood, elementary and secondary school students is available by the Ouachita School District, which leads to graduation from Ouachita High School.

References

Towns in Arkansas
Towns in Hot Spring County, Arkansas